Ian David Goodwin (born 14 November 1950) is an English former professional footballer who made 60 appearances in the Football League playing as a central defender for Coventry City and Brighton & Hove Albion. He was on the books of Oldham Athletic without playing for them in the league, and went on to play for Southern League club Nuneaton Borough. He later coached at Nuneaton Borough and worked in sales and management for motor manufacturers.

References

1961 births
Living people
People from Irlam
English footballers
Association football defenders
Oldham Athletic A.F.C. players
Coventry City F.C. players
Brighton & Hove Albion F.C. players
Nuneaton Borough F.C. players
English Football League players
Southern Football League players